This article is a list of Arizona Diamondbacks owners and executives.  The Arizona Diamondbacks have had two owners and five general managers in their 20-year history. As of October 2017, these executives have compiled a 1222–1208 record, five National League West Division titles (1999, 2000, 2001, 2007, 2011), one National League pennant (2001), and one World Series title (2001). The Diamondbacks' current top executive is owner Ken Kendrick.

Owners
The term "owner" in this section refers to the official title of managing general partner. Actual economic ownership includes the individuals listed, but excludes other owners holding major and minor portions of the team.

General managers

Presidents

Other executives
 Dave Duncan
 Jim Marshall
 Roland Hemond

References

External links
 Baseball America: Executive Database

Arizona Diamondbacks
Owners